An alligator lizard is any one of various species of lizards in the family Anguidae that have some shared characteristics.
The term may specifically refer to:

Species of the genus Elgaria:

 Northern alligator lizard (Elgaria coerulea)
 Madrean alligator lizard (Elgaria kingii)
 Southern alligator lizard (Elgaria multicarinata)
 Panamint alligator lizard (Elgaria panamintina)
 Pygmy alligator lizard (Elgaria parva)
 San Lucan alligator lizard (Elgaria paucicarinata)
 Central Peninsular alligator lizard (Elgaria velazquezi)

Species of the genus Gerrhonotus:

 Farr's alligator lizard (Gerrhonotus farri)
 Texas alligator lizard (Gerrhonotus infernalis)
 Smooth-headed alligator lizard (Gerrhonotus liocephalus)
 Lugo's alligator lizard (Gerrhonotus lugoi)

Species of the genus Abronia (arboreal alligator lizards)

References

Anguids
Former disambiguation pages converted to set index articles